IXI or Ixi can refer to:

  (born 1962), German singer
 IXI Limited, a British software company that existed from 1987 to 1993
 Ixi software, an experimental project for generative music begun in 2001
 code for Lilabari Airport in North Lakhimpur, Assam, India
 IXI (digital audio player), a prototype for a digital music player invented in 1979
 1 × 1, a 1944 book of poetry by E. E. Cummings, sometimes stylized I × I